Six String Nation is public art and history project conceived by Jowi Taylor and centred around a steel-string acoustic guitar built from a variety of artifacts collected by Taylor representing diverse cultures, communities, characters and events from every province and territory of Canada. The building of the guitar was commissioned from Nova Scotia luthier George Rizsanyi.

History 
The idea to build the guitar was conceived by Taylor in the months preceding the 1995 Quebec referendum on sovereignty after a chance encounter with Rizsanyi, who was then attempting to build guitars using wood from local sources rather than more conventional exotic woods. While the impending referendum focussed on the political relationship between the province of Quebec as a francophone minority and the Canadian federal government representing an anglophone majority, Taylor sought to represent additional stakeholders within the national debate including multicultural and indigenous communities as well as francophones living outside of Quebec.
Over a period of eleven years, Taylor researched and gathered contributed materials for the guitar from every province and territory in Canada. A few materials were contributed directly by individuals to Rizsanyi. It was built by Rizsanyi in his workshop near Pinehurst, Nova Scotia, with assistance from Michael McConnell and fretboard inlay work by Sara Nasr. Work on the guitar was completed on June 15, 2006, and tested by musicians Dave MacIsaac of Cape Breton, Nova Scotia and Roger Howse of Newfoundland. Additional elements of metal, leather and fabric have subsequently been added to the case and strap.

The Six String Nation guitar made its debut on Canada Day 2006 on Parliament Hill in Ottawa at the invitation of the National Capital Commission. Following its official introduction, it was played by Stephen Fearing and subsequently during the show by Kyle Riabko, Michel Pagliaro, Colin James, Jean-Francois Breau and Amy Millan. Earlier in the day, it had been played on ancillary stages by Colin Linden, Tom Wilson, Popo Murigande, Joel Fafard and members of La Volée d'Castors. In subsequent years at the Canada Day main stage on Parliament Hill, the guitar was played by J. Knutson (2007), Ron Hynes (2008), Shane Yellowbird (2009), Wayne Lavallee (2010) and the guitarist accompanying Kardinal Offishall (2016). Over the years it has been played by hundreds of musicians - including Feist, Bruce Cockburn, Stompin' Tom Connors, Gordon Lightfoot, Rob Baker, Catherine MacLellan, the African Guitar Summit, K'naan and many others - at public and private events across Canada. The instrumental "Voyageur" by Don Ross from his "Upright and Locked Position" album (2012), was written for and composed on the Six String Nation guitar. In 2013 Jim Henman, a cofounder of Canada's April Wine, was asked to perform a few of his tunes on the Voyageur at his Toronto show and in 2019, an Ontario singer-songwriter composed and recorded an EP of 6 songs drawn from the stories embedded in the guitar, entitled "The Songs of Voyageur". Taylor and the Six String Nation guitar have appeared at festivals, schools, community, conference and corporate events in every province and territory of Canada.

The guitar officially received the nickname Voyageur - as suggested by Lt. Col. Susan Beharriell - at a ceremony launching the 2008 Festival du Voyageur in Winnipeg-St. Boniface.

In 2009, the guitar was part of the Un Paese a Sei Corde international guitar festival in Orta San Giulio, Italy, where it was played by Pino Forastiere and Davide Sgorlon.

In honour of the guitar, a fifty-cent coin was created by the Royal Canadian Mint in 2009. It is in the triangular shape of a guitar pick and features a hologram of the Six String Nation logo on the reverse set into a depiction of Voyageur's sound hole and rosette.

On December 11, 2015, Taylor was awarded the Meritorious Service Medal (Civilian Division) for his work on the project by Governor General David Johnston in a ceremony at Rideau Hall.

Books 
The origins and process of the project as well as the encounters with people across Canada were chronicled in a book by Taylor in 2009, "Six String Nation: 64 Pieces. 6 Strings. 1 Canada. 1 Guitar." (Douglas & Mcintyre publishers) accompanied by photos by Doug Nicholson and Sandor Fizli, including photos of the materials and construction process mostly by Fizli and a selection from among the tens of thousands of portraits of people holding Voyageur taken at events in all provinces and territories of Canada by Nicholson - an ongoing project.

Additionally, the project has been featured in a number of other published texts and workbooks including the grade 9 core French textbook "Tu Parles!" from R.K. Publishing and "Mathematics 10" for western Canada from McGraw-Hill Ryerson.

Media 
A proposed television special and series about the building of the guitar and its subsequent travels was aborted by CBC Television Arts and Entertainment part way through the development process just months before construction on the guitar began on April 30, 2006. At that point, CBC Newsworld producer Deborah Smith stepped in to propose a more modest project called "A Canadian Guitar", which played several times on the now defunct network.

Accompanying Jowi and the Six String Nation team on the journey to Haida Gwaii in February 2006 to obtain the wood from the Golden Spruce was Geoff Siskind, acting in the dual capacity of videographer and audio recordist, the latter for a documentary by renowned CBC radio documentarist Steve Wadhams. Wadhams' experimental audio documentary based on these and other recordings, along with interviews with Jowi and music commissioned from Don Ross, aired in 2007.

An interview on Shaw TV Vancouver's "Urban Rush" show on September 29, 2009 included performances by Barney Bentall.

The project was spoofed on the December 4, 2014 episode (#300193905) of CBC Radio's This Is That in a segment about the creation of a Canadian "unity shovel".

Taylor has appeared in dozens of local and national radio and television interviews about the project, most notably in two full length interviews on TVOntario's The Agenda with Steve Paikin on January 2, 2013 and November 8, 2016.

He was the guest on episode 70 of the Trailer Park Boys podcast, published on SwearNet.com on December 2, 2016. During the episode, Mike Smith, as the character "Bubbles", played the song "Liquor and Whores" on Voyageur.

Materials 

The guitar is made from 64 pieces of wood, bone, metal, stone and horn, representing a variety of cultures, communities, characters and events from every province and territory of Canada.

The guitar case was custom made for Six String Nation by Al Williams of Calton Cases Canada in Calgary, Alberta. The strap was made by Levy's Leathers of Winnipeg Manitoba. Additional pieces of significant material adorn both the case and the strap.

Guitar Diagrams

References

External links 
Six String Nation 
Rizsanyi Guitars

Canadian musical instruments
Individual guitars
2006 works
2006 in Canadian music
National symbols of Canada